In Norse mythology, Niðafjöll (pronounced , also written Niðvellir, often anglicized as Nidafjöll), which means dark mountains, are located in the northern underworld. Niðafjöll is the site from which the dragon Níðhöggr comes. According to Snorri Sturluson, the good and virtuous people will live here in a golden palace after the Ragnarök, despite its proximity to Hel.

Niðafjöll is mentioned in Völuspá  from the Poetic Edda.

References

Other sources
Faulkes, Anthony (trans. and ed.) (1987) Edda of Snorri Sturluson (Everyman's Library) 
Lindow, John (2001) Handbook of Norse mythology (Santa Barbara: ABC-Clio) 
Orchard, Andy (1997) Dictionary of Norse Myth and Legend (Cassell) 
Simek, Rudolf (2007) translated by Angela Hall. Dictionary of Northern Mythology  (D.S. Brewer)

External links
 Bellows, Henry Adams (trans.) (1923) The Poetic Edda. New York: The American-Scandinavian Foundation. Available online in www.voluspa (org).

Locations in Norse mythology
Mythological mountains
Norse underworld